Nicolas Bays (born 1 May 1977) is a French politician who served as Member of Parliament for Pas-de-Calais's 12th constituency between 2012 and 2017.

References 

1977 births
Living people
People from Béthune
La République En Marche! politicians
Socialist Party (France) politicians
21st-century French politicians
Deputies of the 14th National Assembly of the French Fifth Republic
Members of Parliament for Pas-de-Calais